David Anderson (died 1847) was a Scottish statuary and painter, described by Art UK as being "renowned". He was the father of sculptor William Anderson.

Anderson died in Liverpool in 1847.

References

18th-century Scottish painters
19th-century Scottish painters
Scottish male painters
1847 deaths
People from Perth and Kinross
19th-century Scottish male artists